The 2012 Copa del Sol took place in Benidorm and La Manga, Spain between 28 January and 7 February 2012. Unlike last years edition, the format of the competition will be played as a group stage.

Group stage

Benidorm Group

La Manga Group

Final

Winners

Goalscorers

3 goals

 Welliton (Spartak Moscow)

2 goals

 Samuel Eto'o (Anzhi)
 Zlatko Tripić (Molde)
 Nikola Nikezić (Olimpija)
 Bořek Dočkal (Rosenborg)
 Emmanuel Emenike (Spartak Moscow)

1 goals

 Daniel Arnefjord (Aalesund)
 Michael Barrantes (Aalesund)
 Leke James (Aalesund)
 Jason Morrison (Aalesund)
 Christian Myklebust (Aalesund)
 Fredrik Ulvestad (Aalesund)
 Aleksei Ivanov (Anzhi)
 Mos Abdellaoue (Copenhagen)
 Thomas Kristensen (Copenhagen)
 Dame N'Doye (Copenhagen)
 César Santin (Copenhagen)
 Wang Hongyou (Dalian Aerbin)
 Wang Jun (Dalian Aerbin)
 Mikael Dyrestam (Göteborg)
 Philip Haglund (Göteborg)
 Tobias Hysén (Göteborg)
 Daniel Sobralense (Göteborg)
 Papa Diouf (Kalmar)
 Erik Israelsson (Kalmar)
 Daniel Mendes (Kalmar)
 Måns Söderqvist (Kalmar)
 Jo Inge Berget (Molde)
 Daniel Chima Chukwu (Molde)
 Adnan Bešić (Olimpija)
 Dejan Djermanović (Olimpija)
 Dalibor Radujko (Olimpija)
 Filip Valenčič (Olimpija)
 Dare Vršič (Olimpija)
 John Chibuike (Rosenborg)
 Rade Prica (Rosenborg)
 Eduardo (Shakhtar Donetsk)
 Fernandinho (Shakhtar Donetsk)
 Yevhen Seleznyov (Shakhtar Donetsk)
 Artyom Dzyuba (Spartak Moscow)
 Nicolás Pareja (Spartak Moscow)

1 own goal:

 Daniel Arnefjord (Aalesund for Anzhi)
 Shamil Lakhiyalov (Anzhi for Aalesund)

References

External links
 Copa del Sol: Official Page
 Toppfotball.no: Match Reports

2012
2011–12 in Russian football
2011–12 in Slovenian football
2011–12 in Danish football
2011–12 in Ukrainian football
2012 in Norwegian football
2012 in Swedish football
2012 in Chinese football